Edgar Frank "Hike" Heiskell III (October 10, 1940 – November 20, 2016) was an American lawyer and politician.

Heiskell was born in Morgantown, West Virginia and graduated from Morgantown High School. He received his bachelor's degree from West Virginia University in 1963 and his law degree from the University of Virginia School of Law in 1966. Heiskell served in the United States Air Force. He then practiced law. From 1972 to 1975, Heiskell served as West Virginia Secretary of State and was a Republican. He died in Charleston, West Virginia from cancer.

Notes

1940 births
2016 deaths
Politicians from Morgantown, West Virginia
Military personnel from West Virginia
West Virginia University alumni
University of Virginia School of Law alumni
West Virginia lawyers
West Virginia Republicans
Secretaries of State of West Virginia
Deaths from cancer in West Virginia
20th-century American lawyers
Lawyers from Morgantown, West Virginia